Kaitlin Ann Vilasuso (née Riley; born July 17, 1986) is an American actress and podcast host. She is best known for her roles in films From Justin to Kelly (2003), Monster (2003) and Watercolor Postcards (2013).

Early life 
Kaitlin Ann Riley was born on July 17, 1986, in Fort Lauderdale, Florida. She is one of seven children and her younger sister, Bailee Madison, is also an actress. Her mother is Patricia Riley.

Career 
She has appeared in films Catherine's Grove (1997), In the Shadows (2001), From Justin to Kelly (2003), Monster (2003), Scavengers (2013) and Watercolor Postcards (2013). She portrayed Lexy in American television sitcom Kickin' It in the episode "Wedding Crashers".

Since November 2018, she has co-hosted the podcast Just Between Us with her sister Bailee Madison.

Personal life
She began dating actor Jordi Vilasuso in 2010. On May 21, 2012, Kaitlin's sister, Bailee Madison, announced on The Tonight Show with Jay Leno that Kaitlin was pregnant with the couple's first child. The couple announced their engagement in May 2012 and were married on August 25, 2012, in Islamorada, Florida. The couple's first daughter, was born on November 26, 2012. Their second daughter was born on July 15, 2016. They experienced a miscarriage in 2020.

Filmography

References

External links

1986 births
American child actresses
Living people
Actresses from Fort Lauderdale, Florida
American film actresses
American television actresses
American women podcasters
American podcasters
American bloggers
21st-century American actresses